Cladonia alpina (Swedish: Gaffelbägarlav) is a species of lichen that is in the family Cladoniaceae. It has been found in Japan, Norway, and the United Kingdom.

References

alpina